Datin Manis Muka binti Mohd Darah (8 October 1954 – 17 November 2020) was a Malaysian politician. She was a candidate for the Sabah Heritage Party for the Bugaya State Constituency (DUN) seat.

Political career
She started her political career in 1985 and previously held several positions including Semporna UMNO Women Chief, then became Semporna WARISAN Women Chief.

In the 2020 Sabah state election, Manis Muka defended the Bugaya state seat, facing a seven-cornered contest with candidates from the National Alliance (PN), United Sabah National Organization (USNO), Parti Perpaduan Rakyat Sabah (PPRS), Parti Cinta Sabah (PCS). and two independent candidates. With a majority of 6,005 votes, she managed to overcome her six challengers.

Personal life
Manis Muka said about the origin of her name:

There was an error during registration when the name that should have been registered was misspelled as "Manis Buka" (Sweet Open). She is the mother of 10 children, five sons and five daughters.

Death
Manis Muka died on 17 November 2020, at the age of 66, after being admitted to the Intensive Care Unit of Gleneagles Kota Kinabalu Hospital due to kidney problems. Her remains was laid to rest at the Kampung Bugaya Mosque Muslim Cemetery before the Subuh prayers. Prior to her death, she had previously also tested positive for COVID-19 in October.

Election results

References

1954 births
2020 deaths
People from Sabah
Bajau people
Malaysian Muslims
Former United Malays National Organisation politicians
Sabah Heritage Party politicians
Members of the Sabah State Legislative Assembly
Women MLAs in Sabah
Deaths from kidney failure